MLS Season Pass is a soccer streaming service operated by Apple Inc. which includes live matches from Major League Soccer. The package was launched in the 2023 Major League Soccer season as part of a new 10-year media rights agreement between MLS and Apple, under which it holds the global over-the-top streaming rights to the league.

MLS Season Pass is a subscription-based service on Apple TV app, which carries live coverage of all MLS regular season and playoff matches, as well as coverage of the Leagues Cup, selected MLS Next and MLS Next Pro matches, studio programs, and other video content (including match replays and original programming). Under the new contracts, regionally-televised matches have been discontinued, hence all match stream globally with no blackout restrictions.

A selection of matches each week will be made available to stream for free without a subscription. A non-exclusive linear television package of matches was sold to Fox Sports in the United States and Bell Media in Canada.

History
MLS had requested that its teams not negotiate regional television rights to their matches beyond the 2022 season, suggesting that the league was considering switching to a centralized model for its media rights (more akin to the National Football League and European club leagues such as the Premier League) after its present national television agreements with ESPN, Fox Sports, and Univision expire at the same time.

On June 14, 2022, MLS announced a 10-year broadcasting deal with Apple Inc. taking effect in the 2023 season, under which it would hold the global over-the-top media rights to the league. It marked the second major foray by Apple into professional sports rights, after having launched Major League Baseball's Friday Night Baseball earlier that year.

The name and United States pricing of the service was announced on November 16, 2022, with availability beginning February 1, 2023, for the start of the season on February 25, 2023.  

To maintain a presence on linear television, MLS reached three-year, non-exclusive rights agreements with Fox Sports (United States for Fox and Fox Deportes) and Bell Media (Canada for TSN and RDS) to carry packages of MLS matches on their networks. The contract ended the league's long-term associations with ESPN and Univision; ESPN had been one of Major League Soccer's main media partners since its inception. Univision will continue to televise select Leagues Cup matches, including exclusive linear coverage of the final. ESPN and Univision reportedly declined to renew their contracts due to objections to aspects of the Apple contract, as both companies also operate competing streaming platforms (ESPN+—which previously held out-of-market streaming rights, and Vix), and they would no longer hold exclusive rights to the matches they televise.

Distribution 
MLS Season Pass is separate from and does not require Apple TV+, but discounts and select matches are available to Apple TV+ subscribers. Season ticketholders of MLS teams also receive MLS Season Pass for free. A selection of matches throughout the 2023 season will stream free-of-charge without the need for an Apple TV+ subscription; during the opening weekend of the 2023 season, all matches streamed for free, while at least six matches per-week were scheduled during the first weeks of the season afterward.

As it did for Amazon Prime Video's Thursday Night Football in the NFL, DirecTV acquired rights to distribute MLS Season Pass for its commercial subscribers, ensuring the matches' availability to venues (such as bars and restaurants) not readily equipped to handle streaming-only broadcasts.

Production 
MLS Season Pass will carry all MLS regular season and playoff matches live and on-demand, and be the exclusive carrier of all matches not otherwise sub-licensed to a linear broadcaster. It will also carry all Leagues Cup matches, and selected MLS Next and MLS Next Pro matches. As teams can no longer sell packages of matches for regional broadcasts, there are henceforth no blackouts of out-of-market matches.

As of the 2023 season, all MLS telecasts will be produced in-house by the league as part of a joint venture between IMG and NEP Group. All MLS matches aired by MLS Season Pass are produced in 1080p high definition with 5.1 surround sound, and utilize "enhanced data elements". Match commentary is available in English and Spanish, as well as French for matches involving Canadian teams (CF Montréal, Toronto FC, Vancouver Whitecaps). Local radio broadcasts are also available as an option. 

MLS Season Pass produces three studio shows; the pre-match show MLS Countdown, MLS 360 (which carries "whiparound" coverage of each Saturday matchday), and the highlights show MLS Wrap-Up.  It also offers on-demand content such as classic matches, team-produced videos, and original series (such as The Ritual, a docuseries that will highlight the fan cultures of Major League Soccer's franchises).

Announcers
MLS Season Pass uses an in-house staff of commentary teams, with specific commentators expected to be assigned to matches on a regional basis to reduce travel, and provide  familiarity to viewers.

References

External links
 

Season pass
Apple TV+ original programming
2023 American television series debuts
2023 establishments in the United States
Subscription video streaming services
Soccer on Canadian television
Apple Inc. services